Eugène Frouhins (1888–1966) was a French stage and film actor.

Selected filmography
 Fanfare of Love (1935)
 Sing Anyway (1940)
 Annette and the Blonde Woman (1942)
 Devil and the Angel (1946)
 My Friend Sainfoin (1950)
 The Voyage to America (1951)

References

Bibliography 
 Maurice Bessy, André Bernard & Raymond Chirat. Histoire du cinéma français: 1951-1955. Pygmalion, 1989.

External links 
 

1888 births
1966 deaths
French male film actors
French male stage actors

fr:Paul Cambo